Lindsay Richard 'Len' Tuckett (19 April 1885 – 8 April 1963) was a South African cricketer who played in one Test in 1914. He was the father of Lindsay who also played Test cricket. He played domestic cricket for Natal and Orange Free State.

Tuckett is part of one of the more unusual first-class batting records. Playing for the Orange Free State against Western Province at Bloemfontein in the 1925–26 Currie Cup, Tuckett was involved in a century partnership for the tenth wicket in each innings, the only time this has occurred in first-class cricket. Tuckett put on 115 runs in the first innings with Lancelot Fuller, and 129 runs in the second innings with Frank Caulfield. Orange Free State won by 46 runs.

References

1885 births
1963 deaths
KwaZulu-Natal cricketers
Free State cricketers
South Africa Test cricketers
South African cricketers